The second cabinet of Khayreddin al-Ahdab was formed on 13 March 1937, and was a national unity government. It won the confidence of the parliament by consensus. After the reshuffle following the death of Michel Zakour, the confidence was re-discussed and the next cabinet was announced.

Composition

References 

Cabinets established in 1937
Cabinets disestablished in 1937
Cabinets of Lebanon
1937 establishments in Lebanon
1937 disestablishments in Lebanon